Stary Dwór may refer to the following places in Poland:
Stary Dwór, Wołów County in Lower Silesian Voivodeship (south-west Poland)
Stary Dwór, Wrocław County in Lower Silesian Voivodeship (south-west Poland)
Stary Dwór, Kuyavian-Pomeranian Voivodeship (north-central Poland)
Stary Dwór, Podlaskie Voivodeship (north-east Poland)
Stary Dwór, Łódź Voivodeship (central Poland)
Stary Dwór, Masovian Voivodeship (east-central Poland)
Stary Dwór, Greater Poland Voivodeship (west-central Poland)
Stary Dwór, Lubusz Voivodeship (west Poland)
Stary Dwór, Gmina Chmielno in Pomeranian Voivodeship (north Poland)
Stary Dwór, Gmina Somonino in Pomeranian Voivodeship (north Poland)
Stary Dwór, Kwidzyn County in Pomeranian Voivodeship (north Poland)
Stary Dwór, Sztum County in Pomeranian Voivodeship (north Poland)
Stary Dwór, Gmina Dobre Miasto in Warmian-Masurian Voivodeship (north Poland)
Stary Dwór, Gmina Stawiguda in Warmian-Masurian Voivodeship (north Poland)